Cataldo Vito Amodei (6 May 1649 13 July 1693) was an Italian composer of the mid-Baroque period who spent his career in Naples. His cantatas were important predecessors to the active cantata production of 18th-century Naples, and he stands with the elder Francesco Provenzale and younger Alessandro Scarlatti as among the principal cantata composers. Other surviving works include a book of motets dedicated to Leopold I, Holy Roman Emperor; a serenata; two pastorales; two psalms; and four oratorios, which were important contributions to their genre.

His virtuosic 1685 book of cantatas, Cantate, Op. 2, was the first book of cantatas published in Naples.

Life and career

Early life
Cataldo Amodei was born in Sciacca, Sicily, near Agrigento; at the time, Sciacca had a reputation for producing important Sicilian musicians. In 2003, musicologist Domenico Antonio D'Alessandro identified Amodei with a "Cathaldus Vitus" ("Cataldo Vito") born in 6 May 1649 and baptized the same day at St. Mary Magdalene, Sciacca. Accordingly, Amodei's full name was Cataldo Vito Amodei, and he was the last of six children to Gaspare and Antonia, with Antonio de Facio and Francesa Nicolosi as his godparents. His family probably consisted of mostly merchants of Genoese origin. The priest Bonaventura Sanfilippo-Galiotto records in his Sacrum Xacca Theatrum (1710) that Amodei studied with the Maestro di Cappela in Sciacca and violinist Don Accursius Giuffrida; Amodei was purportedly his most talented pupil. The priest Vincenzo Farnia wrote in his 1897 Biografie di uomini illustri nati a Sciacca (Biographies of illustrious men born in Sciacca) that Amodei went to Naples "for the honor that the city is accorded by all the nations as being the mistress of melody" in 1669–70. However, records indicate that Amodei was still in Sciacca; he is first recorded in Naples in 1679, though he may have arrived there between 1670 and 1679.

Naples

In Naples, Amodei was ordained a priest and presumably completed his musical education—the details of which are not extant. In particular, Amodei worked for San Paolo Maggiore until his death, regularly making and performing music; for their services he wrote at least four ontarios: L'innocenza infetta dal pomo, Il flagello dell'empietà, La Susanna and Il Giosuè vittorioso. D'Alessandro notes that records indicate Amodei was actively involved in the music of San Paolo Maggiore, while it remains uncertain whether his other ecclesiastical appointments were occasional or regular. At the church, a Pastorale by Amodei was performed for Christmas 1688, which may be the surviving Pastorale per la novena del Signore for four voices.

He received the additional position of second  at the —another of the major institutions—on 14 September 1687. This post was to assist the primary  , who was finding difficulty in teaching over a hundred students alone. Instructing the students in harpsichord and voice, the governors raised his pay to a ducat over even Acerbo, perhaps in light of his renown as a musician. Upon his obtainment of the Loreto post, governors' records praise Amodei, declaring him "one of the outstanding personalities of the city". Amodei left his position at Sant'Onofrio in 1688 and was succeeded by Cristoforo Caresana—D'Alessandro suggested that he was exhausted from a year of two simultaneous conservatory positions. The February of the following year, he resigned from his post at Santa Maria di Loreto, reportedly "because of his many commitments", and was succeeded there by Alessandro Scarlatti.

Amodei was known as a colleague of Francesco Provenzale, who is often considered the founder of the Neapolitan School, and was probably acquainted with A. Scarlatti. After his time at the conservatories he may have offered private lessons; it is unclear if his student Francesco Bajada was from a conservatory or private pupil. Francesco Solimena painted the  throughout 1690, during which Amodei prepared music for the Feast of Saint Gaetano there. He presumably assisted with the music for subsequent feasts at San Paolo Maggiore, including the Feast Day for the Madonna of Purity (8 September) and Andrew Avellino (10 November). On 13 July 1693, Amodei died in Naples. The city newspaper reported on this the following day: "Yesterday, to universal mourning, the famous Maestro di Cappella of san Paolo, Sig D. Cataldo Omodei [sic] passed away. He was a fine exponent of his profession."

Music

Overview
Amodei's compositions consist of oratorios, motets and cantatas. Almost all of Amodei's works were published in Naples, usually being printed by Novello De Bonis and their "stampator arcivescovile" (""). Novello De Bonis's editions of music by Amodei show them—like Mascardi in Rome—attempting to use a three-systems layout to fit more musical notation per page.

Amodei set text by  twice; first for the 1686 oratorio La Susanna and later for 1692 serenata La sirena consolata. Musicologist Dinko Fabris noted that both Amodei and Perrucci were Sicilians who moved to Naples.

Cantatas
18th-century Naples was an active site of cantata production, first with composers such as A. Scarlatti, Francesco Mancini and Domenico Sarro. Amodei's cantatas were the most significant predecessor to this. Amodei stands with the elder Provenzale and younger A. Scarlatti as among the principal composers of cantatas. His book of 1685 cantatas, Cantate Op. 2, is the earliest book of cantatas to be printed in Naples; the next single cantata was Antion del Ricco's Urania armonica. Cantate a voce sola, Op. 1 of 1686 and the next book was Pergolesi's Quattro cantate da camera of around 1736. The works full title is Cantate a voce sola, libro primo, opera seconda, di Cataldo Amodei, maestro di cappella di San Paolo Maggiore de' molto reverendi Padri Teatini, del Collegio di San Tomaso d'Aquino de' molto reverendi Padri Domenicani, d del Real Conservatorio di S. Honofrio di Napoli. Unlike earlier Italian cantatas such as the anonymous Squarciato appena havea and  L'amante impazzito con altre Cantate, e Serenate a solo, et a due con violini (1679) by Milanese composer , Amodei's Cantate are particularly virtuosic and do not conform to the earlier Italian archetype of ironically setting popular tunes to serious subjects. Musicologist Alfred Einstein favorably compared Amodei's cantata "L'interesse" from the Op. 2 to Richard Wagner's Der Ring des Nibelungen. Einstein explained:

Oratorios
Amodei's four oratorios, L'innocenza infetta dal pomo, Il flagello dell'empietà, La Susanna and Il Giosuè vittorioso are important works in establishing the form and content of Italian oratorios. Described by musicologists Rosa Cafiero and Marina Marino as "rather homogeneous" (")", the works were all written for San Paolo Maggiore and share subject matter and musical form. They are thus exemplary to the Italian oratorio's increasing tendency to have its subject matter, structure, patronage and performance aligned.

During the beginning of the 17th century, librettists were typically more prominent than composers, with the latter more likely to be anonymous. Only one of the oratorios—La Susanna—has a librettist listed (Perrucci), suggesting a switch in the dominance of composers and librettists.

Others
Primo libro de' mottetti (First Book of Motets; 1679), his Op. 1 motets for 2–5 voices, was dedicated to Leopold I, Holy Roman Emperor. The motet's 1679 publication was the first published music in Naples since a 1645–1653 series of various first editions and reprints by composers such as Bartolomeo Cappello, Giovanni Salvatore and Francesco Vannarelli.

Works

Editions
Amodei's works are included in the following collections:

Recordings
Numerous cantatas by Amodei were recorded in Cataldo Amodei: Cantatas (2004) by soprano Emma Kirkby, lutenist Jakob Lindberg and harpsichordist Lars Ulrik Mortensen. Three of these recordings were rereleased in The Artistry of Emma Kirkby (2009).

References

Notes

References

Sources
Books

 
 
 
 
 

Journals and articles

Further reading

 
 
  Includes Rostirolla, Giancarlo. Catalogo generale delle opere a cura di Giancarlo Rostirolla [General catalog of the works by Giancarlo Rostirolla].

Italian Baroque composers
Composers from Sicily
1649 births
1693 deaths
People from Sciacca
17th-century Italian Roman Catholic priests
Italian male classical composers
17th-century Italian composers
Musicians from the Province of Agrigento
17th-century male musicians